Saguny is a rural locality (a sloboda) and the administrative center of Sagunovskoye Rural Settlement, Podgorensky District, Voronezh Oblast, Russia. The population was 1,161 as of 2010. There are 11 streets.

Geography 
Saguny is located 35 km north of Podgorensky (the district's administrative centre) by road. Beryozovo is the nearest rural locality.

References 

Rural localities in Podgorensky District